Nobuaki Futami (born 10 February 1935) is a Japanese politician. He attended Waseda University. Futami was a member of the House of Representatives of Japan from 1969 to 2000. He was also Minister of Transport for the Hata Cabinet in 1994.

References 

1935 births
Living people
People from Taitō
Politicians from Tokyo
Members of the House of Representatives (Japan)
Komeito politicians
Liberal Party (Japan, 1998) politicians
Democratic Party of Japan politicians
Ministers of Transport of Japan
20th-century Japanese politicians
Waseda University alumni